Live—Recher Theatre 06.19.99 is the fourth live album by Crack the Sky. This 2-CD set was released on the band's own label and includes performances of material from throughout the band's career (including main man John Palumbo's solo albums).

Track listing

Crack the Sky live albums
2000 live albums